Isha Foundation is a nonprofit, spiritual organisation that was founded in 1992 near Coimbatore, Tamil Nadu, India, by Sadhguru. It hosts the Isha Yoga Centre, which offers yoga programs under the name Isha Yoga. The foundation is run "almost entirely" by volunteers. The word isha means "the formless divine".

Isha Yoga

The Yoga Centre at the Isha Foundation was founded in 1994, and offers yoga programmes under the name Isha Yoga. This customised system of yoga combines postural yoga with chanting, breathing (prāṇāyāma) and meditation. It does not belong to a lineage (paramparā), and its practitioners believe it to be based on the founding guru's unique insight.

Yoga classes for business leaders are intended to "introduce a sense of compassion and inclusiveness" to economics.

A yoga course for the Indian national hockey team was conducted in 1996. Isha Foundation began conducting yoga programs in the United States in 1997 and, in 1998, yoga classes for life-term prisoners in Tamil Nadu prisons.

Activities 
The foundation organises gatherings (sathsangs) with Vasudev in the Indian states of Tamil Nadu and Karnataka, where he delivers discourses, leads meditations, and conducts question-answer sessions. It organises annual pilgrimages (yatras) to Mount Kailash and the Himalayas. The Kailash-Manasarovar pilgrimage led by Vasudev is among the largest groups to visit Kailash, with 514 pilgrims making the journey in 2010.

The centre hosts an annual seven-day-long music and dance festival culminating in the all-night celebration of Maha Shivaratri, a major Hindu festival honouring Shiva.

The foundation sells various products such as yoga mats, personal care products and accessories. Its US chapter reported revenues of $25m in 2020, with the premium programmes being the largest source. The “business leadership” insights program, in particular, was priced at $6500 per person.

Social and environmental initiatives

Project GreenHands

Project GreenHands (PGH) was established in 2004 as an environmental organisation. Its activity is largely focused on Tamil Nadu. It received the Indira Gandhi Paryavaran Puraskar, the Government of India's environmental award, in 2010. Its activities include agroforestry, plant nurseries in schools, and tree-planting in urban centres such as Tiruchirappalli and Tiruppur.

Action for Rural Rejuvenation

Action for Rural Rejuvenation is a health and community-oriented program focusing on rural Tamil Nadu. It was established in 2003, and as of 2010, operated in 4,200 villages with a population of seven million.

Action for Rural Rejuvenation hosts the annual Gramotsavam sports festival in Tamil Nadu, promoting sports as a part of daily life in rural communities to improve mental and physical well-being. In recognition of this effort, Isha received India's National Sports Promotion Award in the Sport for Development category in 2018.

Isha Vidhya

Isha Vidhya, an education initiative, aims to raise education and literacy in rural India by providing quality English-language-based, computer-aided education for children. There are seven Isha Vidhya Schools, with around 3000 students. In 2010, the Life Insurance Corporation of India Golden Jubilee Foundation provided a grant for construction at an Isha Vidhya School in Coimbatore. In March 2022, the initiative onboarded Byju's to provide digital learning tools to underprivileged children in Tamil Nadu and Andhra Pradesh.

Rally for Rivers

Rally for Rivers was a month-long, nationwide campaign launched by Isha Foundation in 2017 to address the scarcity of water across rivers in India and instill awareness about protecting rivers. Vasudev launched the campaign on 3 September from Isha Yoga Centre, Coimbatore. On 3 October, a river revitalisation draft proposal was presented by Vasudev to Prime Minister of India, Narendra Modi. The states of Karnataka, Assam, Chhattisgarh, Punjab, Maharashtra and Gujarat signed memorandums of understanding with Isha Foundation to plant trees along river banks. The Niti Aayog and the Ministry of Water Resources constituted committees to study the draft policy proposal. Under the name Rally for Rivers, a Cauvery calling campaign was organised which would last over a decade. The project mainly focuses on river Kaveri. In November, at a conference in Germany, the executive director of the United Nations Environment Programme, Erik Solheim, discussed Rally for Rivers with Vasudev, and how environmental programs around the world could emulate its success.

Rally for Rivers has been criticised by environmentalists who allege that it was trying to solve a complex problem with a "shallow solution".

Cauvery Calling 

The Cauvery Calling project aims to support farmers in planting an estimated 2.4 billion trees through agroforestry, thereby covering one third of Cauvery basin with trees as a means of conserving it. The project has received acclaim from politicians and members of the movie industry, yet environmentalists and public intellectuals have alleged that it presents a simplistic view of river conservation, sidestepping social issues and ignoring the potential harm to tributaries and wildlife habitats.

A public interest litigation has also been filed in the Karnataka High Court questioning the legality of the fundraising practices for the initiative, and the usage of government owned land for a private purpose without supporting study. In January 2020, the High Court ruled that the foundation needed to disclose details of its fundraising practices relating to the initiative.

Save Soil 
The Save Soil movement is an international effort to raise awareness about soil health. As part of the campaign, Vasudev completed a 100-day, 30,000 km journey from London to southern India to meet with government officials, international organizations, and interested members of the public. The United Nations’ Convention to Combat Desertification and the World Food Programme have partnered with the organization to address soil degradation and the associated impacts. Countries, such as Barbados, and states in India, such as Rajasthan and Gujarat, have signed a memorandum of understanding with Save Soil. In conjunction with these efforts, the foundation has hosted walkathons for Save Soil in cities across North America.

Critics have noted that the initiative lacks sufficient engagement with public and private institutions.

Ashram

Isha Foundation's headquarters are located in an ashram on the foothills of the Velliangiri Mountains, adjacent to the Nilgiri Biosphere Reserve, some forty kilometres from the city of Coimbatore in the state of Tamil Nadu, India. The foundation's construction activities at Isha Yoga Centre in Coimbatore are alleged to have violated rules and regulations on several occasions. Environmental activists and the local indigenous community have fought against the expansion of the ashram.

Adiyogi Shiva statue

Vasudev designed the 112-foot Adiyogi Shiva statue at the Isha Yoga Centre. It was inaugurated on Mahashivaratri, 24 February 2017, by the Prime Minister of India, Narendra Modi.
The statue depicts Shiva as the first yogi or Adiyogi, and first Guru or Adi Guru, who offered yoga to humanity. It was built by the Isha Foundation using 20,000 individual iron plates supplied by the Steel Authority of India and weighs around 500 tonnes (490 long tons; 550 short tons). It has been recognised as the "Largest Bust Sculpture" by Guinness World Records. A consecrated Shivalinga, Yogeshwar Linga, is at its base.

Controversies and reception
In 2016, a couple claimed that their two adult daughters were held captive at the centre. The foundation denied the allegation and released a statement by the women asserting they were staying there voluntarily. The case was dismissed in court. Another woman alleged that her adult son was being held captive.

A report by Newslaundry alleges Isha Foundation's structures in Ikkarai Boluvampatti, Coimbatore, are built without proper permission from the Hill Area Conservation Authority (HACA), meaning the structures are illegally built.

References

Bibliography

External links

Yoga organizations
Spiritual retreats
Non-profit organisations based in India
Community-building organizations
Recipients of the Rashtriya Khel Protsahan Puruskar